Robert Vágner (born 12 May 1974 in Plzeň) is a Czech former footballer who played as a striker. He played international football for the Czech Republic. Vágner played 230 times in the top division of the Czech Republic, the Czech First League. He played for one season in the Bundesliga with FC Energie Cottbus.

Honours

Újpest
Hungarian Cup: 2001-02

References

External links
 
 
 

Living people
1974 births
Sportspeople from Plzeň
Association football forwards
Czech footballers
Czech Republic under-21 international footballers
Czech Republic international footballers
Czech expatriate footballers
Czech First League players
FC Viktoria Plzeň players
SK Slavia Prague players
FK Teplice players
Újpest FC players
FC Energie Cottbus players
Ferencvárosi TC footballers
Expatriate footballers in Hungary
Czech expatriate sportspeople in Hungary